Seydou is the Francophonic-orthography variant of the Arabic name Sa'id, commonly used in West Africa.

Notable people with the name include:

Seydou Bouda (born 1958), Burkinabé politician and US Ambassador
Mohamed Seydou Dera (born 1986), Côte d'Ivoire footballer
Seydou Diarra (1933–), Ivorian political figure, Prime Minister in 2000 and from 2003 to 2005
Pape Seydou Diop (born 1979), Senegalese international footballer
Seydou Doumbia (born 1987), Ivorian footballer
Seydou Badjan Kanté (born 1981), former Ivory Coast-born football defender
Seydou Keita (footballer) (born 1980), Malian professional footballer
Seydou Keïta (photographer) (1921–2001), self-taught portrait photographer from Bamako
Seydou Koné (born 1983), Ivorian professional football player
Seydou Badian Kouyaté (born 1928), Malian writer and politician
Seydou Njoya (1902–1992), ruled the Bamum people of Cameroon from 1933 to 1992
Chris Seydou (1949–1994), Malian fashion designer
Mayaki Seydou (born 1949), former Nigerien bantamweight boxer
Seydou Traoré (born 1970), former Burkinabé footballer